Allodahliinae is a subfamily of earwigs in the family Forficulidae. There are at least 3 genera and about 16 described species in Allodahliinae.

Genera 
These three genera belong to the subfamily Allodahliinae:

 Allodahlia Verhoeff, 1902
 Brindleiana Steinmann, 1975
 Eulithinus Hincks, 1935

References

Further reading 

 
 

Forficulidae